The Hermitage Hotel in Mount Cook Village, New Zealand, is a hotel located inside the Aoraki / Mount Cook National Park,  north of Twizel. The current building is from 1958 and forms the main part of Mount Cook Village, being the only large building.

Description
The hotel and a lodge & motel complex also owned and operated by The Hermitage, form the main parts of Mount Cook Village, with the hotel being the only large building in the area. The current site, slightly elevated on the valley-side was chosen in 1913 for its unimpeded views of Aoraki / Mount Cook and Mount Sefton.

Most rooms in the main hotel building facing north enjoy views of Aoraki / Mount Cook, as do the two restaurants through their large glass windows. Below the also clearly visible Mount Sefton is Huddleston Glacier, named after the original hotel developer Frank Huddleston, a surveyor and painter from Timaru, who was appointed ranger for the Mount Cook area in the 1880s.

The Hermitage Hotel further houses the Sir Edmund Hillary Alpine Centre, showcasing the region and its history. It includes a cinema showing related documentary films, and a museum in the foyer, It also has a planetarium 

Organised tours on the nearby walking tracks, bus tours, and boat tours on the Tasman glacier lake use the hotel as their base, with tours leaving and returning at the main building's foyer and car park.

The village's only retail shop is also contained within the main hotel building, comparable to a very small dairy (convenience store) in its range of groceries.

History
The current hotel is the third successive building in the area named "The Hermitage".

The first one, built in 1884, was a cob house built by Frank Huddleston, in a location slightly further up the valley towards Mueller Glacier.

At the time, the land was not yet a National Park, and ownership passed through various companies until it ended up being owned by the New Zealand Government in 1896.
Travel from Twizel was originally by horse-drawn coaches, then later by the Mount Cook Motor Company. 

A larger hotel, again called The Hermitage, was built and opened at the current site in 1914 to cater to increased demand for what were one of the first package tours in New Zealand in the 1920s. The hotel flourished and was extended twice, until it burned down to the ground on 15 September 1957.

The government quickly designed and built a new hotel, which opened only 8 months later in May 1958. This third hotel building was later extended and upgraded several times to become the current Hermitage hotel. In May 2020, it was announced that The Hermitage would close indefinitely with the loss of 157 jobs. The smaller Mt Cook Lodge was set to reopen from 24 September 2020, which coincides with the school holidays between terms 3 and 4, but the full hotel reopened instead in July 2020. By September staff numbers were back up to about 70 and 130 rooms were open. Along with NZ Ski, also owned by Trojan Holdings, The Hermitage declined funds from the strategic tourism assets protection programme (Stapp).

Along with a nearby lodge and motels, the hotel trades as Aoraki Mt Cook Alpine Village and is owned by Trojan Holdings.

References

H
H
H
H
H